The Erskine College–Due West Historic District, is a  historic district  in Due West, South Carolina, in the United States. It consists of 88 contributing properties and includes part of the campus of Erskine College as well as private homes, businesses, and other buildings in the town of Due West. On March 19, 1982, it was listed in the National Register of Historic Places

See also
 List of Registered Historic Places in South Carolina

References

External links
 South Carolina Department of Archives and History listing

Geography of Abbeville County, South Carolina
Historic districts on the National Register of Historic Places in South Carolina
Erskine College
National Register of Historic Places in Abbeville County, South Carolina